The Royal Society is a society for science in the United Kingdom.

Royal Society may also refer to:

Organisations

Australia
 Royal Society of New South Wales
 Royal Society of Queensland
 Royal Society of South Australia
 Royal Society of Tasmania
 Royal Society of Victoria
 Royal Society of Western Australia

Other
 Royal Society of Canada
 Royal Society of New Zealand
 Royal Society of South Africa
 Royal Society of Thailand
 Royal Society of Edinburgh, Scotland, UK

Other uses
The Royal Society (album), an album by the Eighties Matchbox B-Line Disaster
Royal Society Range, a mountain range in Antarctica

See also
 List of Royal Societies
 Real Sociedad